1949 in Korea may refer to:
1949 in North Korea
1949 in South Korea